At least two ships of the French Navy have been named Fleuret:

 , a  launched in 1907 and struck in 1920
 , a  launched in 1938, she was renamed Foudroyant in 1941 and scuttled in 1942

French Navy ship names